Figure skating at the 1960 Winter Olympics took place at the Blyth Arena in Squaw Valley, California, United States. Three figure skating events were contested: men's singles, ladies' singles and pair skating.

Medalists

Medal table

References

External links
 Results of the Olympic Winter Games (archived)

 
1960 Winter Olympics events
1960
1960 in figure skating
International figure skating competitions hosted by the United States